Dr. William Patton Thornton (February 6, 1817 – October 10, 1883) was a physician, educator, author, and politician.

Education and career
Thorton graduated from Kemper's Medical College in St. Louis and Jefferson Medical College in Philadelphia. After graduation he spent five years in Houston, Mississippi, where he began to specialize in diseases of the trachea and larynx.

In 1847, Thornton returned to Ohio and established a practice. He began a long affiliation with the Cincinnati Hospital and the University of Cincinnati College of Medicine, where he was chair of the Anatomy and Physiology Department. Thornton published papers on cholera and laryngology.

After retiring from practice in 1877, Thornton served as mayor of College Hill, Ohio, until his death. He was buried in Spring Grove Cemetery, Cincinnati, Ohio.

Family
In 1841, William Thornton married Electa Bacon in Indianapolis, Indiana. He was cousin to Samuel W. Thornton and James Johnston Thornton.

Notes

1817 births
People from Hillsboro, Ohio
Burials at Spring Grove Cemetery
1883 deaths
People from Logansport, Indiana
People from Houston, Mississippi